Zhambyl District is a district of Almaty Region in Kazakhstan. The administrative center of the district is the selo of Uzynagash. Population:

See also
Otar Military Base

References

Districts of Kazakhstan
Almaty Region